General elections were held in Saint Vincent and the Grenadines on 28 March 2001. The Unity Labour Party (ULP), which had won the popular vote in the 1998 elections but lost to the New Democratic Party (NDP), this time won a landslide victory, taking 12 of the 15 seats, ending seventeen years of an NDP government. The NDP retained only three of its eight seats inclusive of the two Grenadines seats which had voted for the party's former leader, Sir James Mitchell, in every general election since 1966.

With his ULP having won every election that followed, Gonsalves became the country's longest continuously-serving head of government in 2017, surpassing the previous record-holder, James Mitchell who had served continuously for 16 years and 2 months.

Results

References

Saint Vincent
Elections in Saint Vincent and the Grenadines
2001 in Saint Vincent and the Grenadines
March 2001 events in North America